Captain Charles M. Weber of Applied Science and Technology, often simply abbreviated as Weber Institute, is a public school serving grades 9-12.  It is in the Stockton Unified School District.  It has an enrollment of 500 (approximately).

History
Weber Institute was founded as a "specialty" school that specializes in the fields of technology, health and automobile maintenance. Incoming freshmen have to fill out an application form and write an essay describing why they would like to attend Weber. Weber was named after Captain Charles M. Weber, the founding father of the city of Stockton.

Academics
Weber Institute is divided into three academies technology, which consist of classes like webpage design, drafting, digital arts, digital graphics, photography, multimedia, 3-D modeling, and more recently video game design. Health has like courses like health class and biology. Automobile deals with cars, repairing them or modifying them. In addition to these academies, Weber also has a freshman academy in which freshman take general courses before choosing any of the previous academy.

Extracurriculars

Clubs
Weber Institute has many clubs and activities such as Key Club, in which student do community services to the local area within the city. SkillsUSA, which helps students compete against each other which helps gained knowledge for the work force and has been successful with students.

References

External links
 
 http://weber-susd-ca.schoolloop.com/
 San Joaquin County Biographies CAPTAIN CHARLES M. WEBER

Education in Stockton, California
High schools in San Joaquin County, California